The Battle of the Strait of Otranto was a minor naval skirmish on 12 November 1940 during the Battle of the Mediterranean in World War II. It took place in the Strait of Otranto in the Adriatic Sea, between Great Britain and Italy.

Background
The battle occurred when an Allied squadron entered the Adriatic Sea looking for Italian naval targets. Although they did not know it at the time the squadron's real purpose was to help draw enemy attention from a major action against the main Italian fleet base at Taranto (Battle of Taranto).

On 12 November, an Italian Navy (Regia Marina) convoy of four merchant ships—Antonio Locatelli, Premuda, Capo Vado and Catalani—were on their way back from Valona, Albania to Brindisi, Italy while escorted by the World War I-era torpedo boat , commanded by T.V.c. Giovanni Barbini and the auxiliary cruiser  commanded by C.F. Francesco De Angelis. The ships were travelling darkened without navigational lights.

Battle
The Allied ships proceeded north during the night of 11 November, and upon reaching a notional line between Bari and Durazzo by 01:00 without incident, they turned to run southward. Twenty minutes later, the raiders encountered six darkened enemy ships, including what they thought were two destroyers and four merchantmen. The enemy vessels passed across their front and were making for the Italian mainland. HMS Mohawk opened fire at 01:27, and action became general.

Over the next 23 minutes, the other three merchantmen were either sunk or damaged and left burning. Fabrizi was hit and heavily damaged, and limped toward Valona with 11 dead and 17 wounded. Ramb III after an initial discharge of 19 salvoes from her  guns broke off the action unscathed. The merchantmen were all sunk in the action.

The Allies suffered no damage or casualties, although a torpedo narrowly missed Sydneys stern at 01:40. The Italians suffered 36 dead and 42 wounded.

Aftermath

The Italians retaliated by sending aircraft of the Regia Aeronautica to locate the British naval squadron; however, the CANT flying boats which eventually located the naval squadron were shot down.

The day after the battle, two Italian torpedo boats— and —rescued a total of 140 sailors.

Order of battle

Regia Marina
 Captain Francesco De Angelis
 Torpedo boat  (damaged)
 Auxiliary cruiser 
 4 merchantmen, Antonio Locatelli, Premuda, Capo Vado and Catalani (all sunk)

Allies
 Rear Admiral Henry Pridham-Whippel
 2 destroyers:  and

Notes

References

 
 
 

 (IT) Carlo Stasi, Otranto e l'Inghilterra (episodi bellici in Puglia e nel Salento), in "Note di Storia e Cultura Salentina", anno XV, (Argo, Lecce 2003)
 (IT) Carlo Stasi, Otranto nel Mondo. Dal "Castello" di Walpole al "Barone" di Voltaire (Editrice Salentina, Galatina 2018) , 
 Thomas P. Lowry, The Attack on Taranto (Stackpoole Books paperbacks, 2000) 

Conflicts in 1940
1940 in Italy
Mediterranean Sea operations of World War II
Naval battles of World War II involving Australia
Naval battles of World War II involving Italy
Strait of Otranto
Mediterranean convoys of World War II
November 1940 events
Allied naval victories in the battle of the Mediterranean
Otranto